Felix M. Gradstein (born 1941, in the Netherlands) is a Dutch-Canadian academic and a pioneer in quantitative stratigraphy and geologic time scale. At the University of Utrecht, he studied paleontology and stratigraphy, obtaining his Ph.D. taking a novel biometrical approach in micropaleontology, under the supervision of Professor CW Drooger. In 1976, after working two years for an oil company in Calgary, Canada, he joined the Geological Survey of Canada in its eastern division at the Bedford Institute of Oceanography in Nova Scotia. During his research there, he was instrumental in developing a novel quantitative method for the analysis of stratigraphic events.  In 1992 Felix moved to Norway where he currently has an office at the University of Oslo and is Visiting Research Fellow at, University of Portsmouth, UK. From 1985 - 1989, he was chairman of International Geoscience Project (IGCP) 181 on Quantitative Stratigraphy. From 2000 to 2008 he was chair of the International Commission on Stratigraphy (ICS) and in 2010 was instrumental in founding the Geologic Time Scale Foundation. For his fundamental work concerning the Geologic Time Scale, geochronology in general, quantitative stratigraphy, and micropaleontology, the European Geosciences Union awarded him in 2010 the Jean Baptiste Lamarck Medal. Prof. Gradstein, a world-renowned stratigrapher discussed debates over the Geologic Time Scale with the Anthropocene working Group.

As a micropaleontologist and marine stratigrapher Felix also was an active participant in expeditions of the Deep Sea Drilling Project (DSDP) and International Ocean Drilling Project (IODP). As a co-chief scientist in 1980 on DSDP Leg 76 in the Blake Bahama Basin the age of the Atlantic Ocean (~ 165 Ma) was discovered.

Education

Employment
 2014–2017: 	Visiting professor, Micropaleontology/Stratigraphy Institute (ITT Fossil) of Unisinos, Sao Leopoldo, Brasil.
 2001–2014: 	Professor II in Stratigraphy/Micropaleontology, Natural History Museum (NHM), University of Oslo
 1995–2000:	Senior Stratigrapher, Saga Petroleum, Norway
 1974–1995:    Senior Stratigrapher, Geological Survey of Canada
 1972–1974:    Stratigrapher, Esso, Canada

Awards and honors
Best Book Award of the Romanian Academy of Sciences (2007).

Books
 Gradstein FM, Agterberg FP, Brower JC, Schwarzacher WS (1985) Quantitative stratigraphy. Reidel, Dordrecht & UNESCO, Paris, 598 pp
 Gradstein FM, Ogg J, Smith A (2004) A Geologic Time Scale. Cambridge University Press, Cambridge, 589 pp
 Gradstein, FM, Ogg, J., Schmitz, MB, Ogg, GM (rds, 2012) Geologic Time Scale 2012, two volumes, Elsevier, Amsterdam, 1144pp.
 Gradstein FM, Ogg J, Schmitz MB, Ogg GM (eds, 2020) Geologic Time Scale 2020. Two volumes, Elsevier, Amsterdam, 1357 pp
 Kaminski, M.A. and Gradstein, F.M., 2005. Atlas of Cosmopolitan Deep Water Agglutinated Foraminifera (Paleogene). Memoir, Grzybowski Foundation, 500 pp., 140 plates (book).

Selected publications 
 Gradstein FM (1974) Mediterranean Pliocene Globorotalia – a biometrical approach. PhD thesis, Utrecht Univ, published by Krips Repro, Meppel, Netherlands, 128 pp
 Gradstein FM, Agterberg FP (1982) Models of Cenozoic Foraminiferal Stratigraphy – Northwestern Atlantic Margin. In: Cubitt JM, Reyment RA (eds) Quantitative Stratigraphic Correlation. Wiley, New York, pp. 119–173
 Gradstein, Felix and Waskowska, Anna, 2021. New insights into the taxonomy and evolution of Jurassic planktonic foraminifera. Swiss J Palaeontol (2021) 140:1 https://doi.org/10.1186/s13358-020-0
 Felix Gradstein, Anna Waskowska and Larisa Glinskikh, 2021. The First 40 Million Years of Planktonic Foraminifera. Geosciences 2021, 11, 85. https://doi.org/10.3390/geosciences11020085
 Kent DV, Gradstein FM (1986) A Jurassic to Recent geochronology. In: Vogt PR, Tucholke (eds) The geology of North America Vol M: The Western North Atlantic Region. Geological Society of America, Boulder Colorado, pp 45–50

References 

1941 births
Living people
Utrecht University alumni
Micropaleontologists
Geological Survey of Canada personnel
Academic staff of the University of Oslo